"Isn't It a Pity?" is a song composed by George Gershwin, with lyrics by Ira Gershwin, written for the unsuccessful 1933 musical Pardon My English. It was introduced by George Givot and Josephine Huston.

Notable recordings 
Victor Arden - Phil Ohman & Their Orchestra (vocal by Scrappy Lambert) - recorded on December 8, 1932 for Victor Records (catalog No. 24206).
Eddy Duchin &  His Central Park Casino Orchestra - recorded on January 18, 1933 for Brunswick Records (catalog No. 6476).
Sarah Vaughan - Sarah Vaughan Sings George Gershwin (EmArcy, 1958)
Ella Fitzgerald - Ella Fitzgerald Sings the George and Ira Gershwin Songbook (1959)
Mitzi Gaynor - Mitzi Gaynor Sings the Lyrics of Ira Gershwin (Verve, 1959).
Beverly Kenney - Born to be Blue (1959). 
Mabel Mercer - Once in a Blue Moon (1959)
Johnny Mathis - The Rhythms and Ballads of Broadway (1960)
Mel Tormé - That's All (1965) and Mel Tormé and Friends (1981).
Carol Sloane - But Not For Me (1986)
Michael Feinstein w/ Rosemary Clooney - Pure Gershwin (Asylum, 1987)
Mel Torme and Cleo Laine - Nothing Without You (1992)
Shirley Horn - Here's to Life (1992)
Barbra Streisand - A Love Like Ours (1999)
Stacey Kent - Dreamsville (2001)
Russell Watson and Victoria Hart - The Lost Gershwin (2008).

References 

Songs with music by George Gershwin
Songs with lyrics by Ira Gershwin
Ella Fitzgerald songs
1933 songs